Paul Emil Friederich Hellmuth  (1 November 1879 – June 1919) was a Danish organist and composer. Hellmuth was a student of Carl Nielsen and collaborated with Nielsen to harmonize the melodies of some of Nielssen's hymns, for example Forunderligt at sige.

See also
List of Danish composers

References

This article was initially translated from the Danish Wikipedia.

External links
 

Danish composers
Male composers
Danish classical organists
Male classical organists
1879 births
1919 deaths